Shiprock ("rock with wings" or "winged rock") is a monadnock rising nearly  above the high-desert plain of the Navajo Nation in San Juan County, New Mexico, United States.

Governed by the Navajo Nation, the formation is in the Four Corners region and plays a significant role in Navajo religion, myth, and tradition. It is located in the center of the area occupied by the Ancient Pueblo People, a prehistoric Native American culture of the Southwest United States often referred to as the Anasazi. Shiprock is a point of interest for rock climbers and photographers and has been featured in several film productions and novels. It is the most prominent landmark in northwestern New Mexico. In 1975, Shiprock was designated a National Natural Landmark by the National Park Service.

Name
The Navajo name for the peak, "rock with wings" or "winged rock", refers to the legend of the great bird that brought the Navajo from the north to their present lands. The name "Shiprock" or Shiprock Peak or Ship Rock derives from the peak's resemblance to an enormous 19th-century clipper ship. Americans first called the peak "The Needle", a name given to the topmost pinnacle by Captain J. F. McComb in 1860. United States Geological Survey maps indicate that the name "Ship Rock" dates from the 1870s.

Geology
Shiprock, an example of a volcanic neck, is composed of fractured volcanic breccia and black dikes of igneous rock called minette, a type of lamprophyre. It is the erosional remnant of the throat of a volcano, and the volcanic breccia formed in a diatreme. The rock probably was originally formed 2,500–3,000 feet (750–1,000 meters) below the Earth's surface, but it was exposed after millions of years of erosion. Wall-like sheets of minette, known as dikes, radiate away from the central formation. Radiometric age determinations of the minette establish that these volcanic rocks solidified about 27 million years ago. Shiprock is in the northeastern part of the Navajo volcanic field—a field that includes intrusions and flows of minette and other unusual igneous rocks that formed about 30 million years ago. Agathla (El Capitan) in Monument Valley is another prominent volcanic neck in this volcanic field.

Climbing history and legal status
The first ascent was in 1939, by a Sierra Club party including David Brower, Raffi Bedayn, Bestor Robinson and John Dyer. This was the first climb in the United States to use expansion bolts for protection.  Pitons were used for direct aid. This first ascent route is featured in the book Fifty Classic Climbs of North America.

Since then at least seven routes have been climbed on the peak, all of them of great technical difficulty. A modification of the original route is recorded as the easiest, and it is rated as Grade IV, YDS 5.9, A1.
It was considered a great unsolved problem by the climbing community in the 1920s and 1930s. At that time there was a widespread rumor of a $1000 prize for climbing the peak, which inspired "dozens of attempts by the experienced and inexperienced alike".

The idea of climbing Shiprock is repugnant to many Navajo people. Climbing has been illegal since 1970. In spite of this, rock climbers continue to see Shiprock as an interesting place to climb.

Serious injuries to three climbers in March 1970 caused the Navajo Nation to ban rock climbing not only on Shiprock but all over the Navajo Nation on monoliths, spires and within tribal parks under the jurisdiction of Navajo Parks & Recreation. The Navajo Nation announced that the ban was "absolute, final and unconditional".

According to reports from the Navajo Parks and Recreation Department, which administers recreational activities on Navajo land, there have been false claims that the department allows rock climbing and cooperates with rock climbing organizations. A 2006 press release addressing Monument Valley, another area of monoliths within the Navajo Nation, states:

Permits are issued by the department to camp and hike in some areas, but not for sacred monuments such as Shiprock.

Religious and cultural significance
Shiprock and the surrounding land have religious and historical significance to the Navajo people. It is mentioned in many of their myths and legends. Foremost is the peak's role as the agent that brought the Navajo to the southwest. According to one legend, after being transported from another place, the Navajos lived on the monolith, "coming down only to plant their fields and get water." One day, the peak was struck by lightning, obliterating the trail and leaving only a sheer cliff, and stranding the women and children on top to starve.

Navajo legend puts the peak in a larger geographic context. Shiprock is said to be either a medicine pouch or a bow carried by the "Goods of Value Mountain", a large mythic male figure comprising several mountain features throughout the region. The Chuska Mountains comprise the body, Chuska Peak is the head, the Carrizo Mountains are the legs, and Beautiful Mountain is the feet.

Navajo legend has it that Bird Monsters nested on the peak and fed on human flesh. After Monster Slayer, elder of the Warrior Twins, destroyed  at Red Mesa, he killed two adult Bird Monsters at Shiprock and changed two young ones into an eagle and an owl. The peak is mentioned in stories from the Enemy Side Ceremony and the Navajo Mountain Chant, and is associated with the Bead Chant and the Naayee'ee Ceremony.

Climate

Gallery

See also
 Rock formations in the United States
 Volcanic plug
 Diné Bahaneʼ

References

External links

 Shiprock.org: Shiprock
 Shiprock @ discover-navajo
 flickr: Shiprock photo gallery
 3D Movie tour of Shiprock

Rock formations of New Mexico
Religious places of the indigenous peoples of North America
Landmarks in New Mexico
Volcanic plugs of the United States
Diatremes of New Mexico
Landforms of San Juan County, New Mexico
Geography of the Navajo Nation
National Natural Landmarks in New Mexico
Oligocene volcanism
Oligocene North America
Neogene geology of New Mexico